All Out of Love is a 2018 Chinese television series based on Le Xiaomi's novel Liang Sheng, Can We Not Be Sad. It is directed by Liu Junjie, and stars Wallace Chung, Ma Tianyu and Sun Yi. It airs on Hunan TV on September 17, 2018.

Synopsis
Because of their family situation and hard life, Jiang Sheng (Sun Yi) and her older adopted brother, Liang Sheng (Ma Tianyu) leans on each other to survive. Even though materialistic substance was scarce, the greatest happiness for both of them was to be by each other's side.

After an accident during their university days, Liang Sheng got badly injured and disappears for many years. With the accompaniment of Cheng Tianyou (Wallace Chung), Jiang Sheng searches high and low for Liang Sheng. Tianyou falls in love with the seemingly normal but extraordinary Jiang Sheng.  His devotion pays off, they fall in love and ready to start a family together.  However, the reappearance of Liang Sheng complicates things as he was revealed to be Cheng Tianyou’s cousin. Led to believe Liang Sheng has terminal illness, Jiang sacrifices her relationship with Cheng Tianyou in order to take care of Liang Sheng.  As Liang Sheng starts to recover, he finally confesses his love to Jiang Sheng and rejected by her. After many trials and tribulations Jiang Sheng finally realizes the true meaning of life and love, and decides to bravely pursue her heart.  Jiang Sheng goes to France and after many hardships, the lovers finally harvested their faith in love.

Cast

Main 
Wallace Chung as Cheng Tianyou 
With superior appearance and commanding aura he is the eldest young master of The Cheng Organization who just returned from overseas and took over as CEO of The Cheng Organization; CEO of Yongnan Models an entertainment agency. He fell in love with Jiang Sheng at first sight. He stays by Jiang Sheng's side through thick and thin.  After several separations from her he is still in love with her and waiting for her return. Unfortunately he became blind rescuing her and goes to Paris to protect her. After recovering he bravely pursues his heart and reconciles with Jiang Sheng. He also realizes his entrepreneurial ideal of changing the world in order to fulfill his life
Ma Tianyu as Liang Sheng
Third young master of The Cheng Organization.Due to some events he becomes the adopted brother of Jiang Sheng when they were still kids.  He’s extremely loyal caring and passionate to Jiang Sheng. He is deeply in love with only Jiang Sheng.  Although he has been dating Wei Yang for more than a decade he cancels the wedding on the eve of the wedding. After Jiang Sheng marries Cheng Tianyou he gives them his blessings.
Sun Yi as Jiang Sheng
Liang Sheng's sister-in-name with no blood relation. She heavily relies, depends and trusts her brother due to unfortunate family circumstances. After an accident he goes missing and with Cheng Tianyou’s help she searches for him but they fail to find him successfully. She falls in love with Cheng Tianyou but Liang Sheng’s return complicated things. With Liang Sheng seemingly suffering from terminal illness she sacrifices her love for Cheng Tianyou to accompany and save Liang Sheng’s life. After Liang Sheng recovers she leaves him to pursue true love.
Yu Menglong as Cheng Tianen
Cheng Tianyou's brother. He was crippled since young due to his brother's negligence, causing him to be able to manipulate Cheng Tianyou to the latter's guilt.  
Meng Ziyi as Ning Wei Yang 
Jiang Sheng's close friend, who is in love with Liang Sheng. Because of her unrequited love, she set down on a path of revenge and destruction.

Supporting 
Lu Ruo as Bei Xiaowu
Liang Sheng and Jiang Sheng's childhood friend. He likes Xiao Jiu. 
Wang Zhi as Ning Xin
Cheng Tianyou's business partner and assistant.  She is in love with him but failed to come together with him due to a mistake made by her sister Ning Weiyang.
He Zhilong as Qian Zi 
 Cheng Tianyou’s personal assistant who assists him in life and career.
Huang Yilin as Su Man 
An artist signed under Cheng Tianyou's company.
Zhang Xiaochen as Lu Wenjun 
Liang Sheng's half brother.
Wang Herun as Jin Ling 
A reporter. She is Jiang Sheng's closest friend and would do anything to protect her. She is also persistent toward her love for Cheng Tianen. 
Li Meng as Xiao Jiu 
Jiang Sheng's friend. She(6 years old that time) and father were left alone when her mother ran away with another man. She fell in love with Bei Xiaowu. Later,finds her mother, who is suffer from brain trauma, and for the best treatment of her mother, she was forced to cheat Jiang Sheng.
Wang Yizhe as Ba Bao  
Nile Telong as Ke Xiaorou 
Xu Fanxi as Jiang Sheng's mother
Yan Luyang as Li Le 
Dongli Wuyou as Meng Haoran 
Liu Yapeng as Housekeeper

Soundtrack

Ratings 

 Sunday to Thursday 20:00-22:00, Friday and Saturday 19:30-20:20

 Monday, Tuesday 22:00-24:00

References

External links

Chinese romance television series
Television shows based on Chinese novels
Hunan Television dramas
2018 Chinese television series debuts
Television series by Ciwen Media
2018 Chinese television series endings